The Ascot Golf Club was founded in 1887, and became a Royal Club by command of Queen Victoria later that year. It is the second oldest, and the only Royal, golf club in Berkshire. The course was designed by John Henry Taylor, who went on to design many courses in Europe.

One of the earlier competitions played on the course was the Boys Amateur Championship, which was first played in 1921. The Trophy for this was presented to The Royal and Ancient Golf Club of St Andrews, who continue to host the competition annually.

The original course was at Ascot Heath, in the middle of Ascot Racecourse. In 2000, the racecourse owners gave the club notice to vacate the land, and eventually a new location was found on the other side of the road in Sunninghill Park. The new clubhouse opened to members in December 2004 and was officially inaugurated in 2006 by the patron of the club, Prince Andrew, Duke of York. Golf continued on Ascot Heath until August 2005 when it moved to the new course.

See also
List of golf clubs granted Royal status

References

External links

Golf clubs and courses in Berkshire
2006 establishments in England
Royal golf clubs